Russian invasion of Ukraine may refer to:

 1919 Soviet invasion of Ukraine
 Russo-Ukrainian War
 February 2014 Russian annexation of Crimea
 August 2014 Russian invasion during the War in Donbas
 Russian invasion of Ukraine (2022–present)